Continental Divide Raceways was a race track located in Castle Rock, Colorado.  Built in 1959, it featured a  road course, half-mile (.805 km) oval, and  drag strip.  The land was intended to be used for a multi-sport spectator venue, but a racing complex was built after a hill climb was staged on the property.  The track saw its most active time in the 1960s, hosting the USAC National Championship, major sports car races, and Trans-Am. On July 30, 1972 Evel Knievel successfully jumped 11 Dodge vehicles on his motorcycle at the track. The track closed in 1979 due to a fatal accident but reopened in 1981, holding a NASCAR Winston West Series stock car race in 1982 before being sold to real estate developers in 1983. There was a motocross track called CDR Tech Track on the property where an AMA Motocross National was held in 1981 and 1982

Lap records
The fastest official race lap records at the Continental Divide Raceways are listed as:

Race results

USAC Champ Car "Rocky Mountain 150"

Sports car races

Trans-Am

References

Motorsport venues in Colorado
NASCAR tracks
Defunct motorsport venues in the United States
Sports venues completed in 1959
1959 establishments in Colorado
1983 disestablishments in Colorado